St. Audoen's Church (within Newgate) (alternatively known as St. Ewen's, St. Ewan's or St. Ewin's) was a mediaeval parish church in the City of London situated on the north-east corner of Newgate Street and Eldeness Lane (now Warwick Lane). It was first mentioned as Parochia sancti Audoeni in around 1220. Named in honour of Audoen or Ouen, the seventh century Bishop of Rouen, it was anciently called Sti Audoeni juxta fratres minores London (infra Newgate). Like its sister church in Dublin, it is believed that this was home to a religious guild of St. Anne.

In 1546, Henry VIII gave the church, along with St Nicholas Shambles and the dissolved Christ Church priory to the City corporation. A new parish was created for Christ Church, out of those of  St Audoen and St Nicholas, and part of that of St Sepulchre. St Audoen's Church was demolished in around 1583.

Notes

 

13th-century church buildings in England
1583 disestablishments in England
Churches in the City of London
Former buildings and structures in the City of London
Demolished buildings and structures in London
Buildings and structures demolished in the 16th century